Roman Konstantinovich Ovchinnikov (born 5 February 1987) is a former Russian football forward.

Career
Ovchinnikov spent two seasons with Zenit U-21 team. He started 2005 year playing for Russian First Division club Petrotrest. In the midseason he moved to Belarusian BATE, where he once appeared for the first team.

After leaving BATE, Ovchinnikov received a serious injury while on trial with Dinamo of Saint Petersburg that kept him out of football for 1,5 years. He had never found himself a new club and retired in 2010. He played for several more years on amateur (fifth-tier and below) levels.

References

External links
  Profile at stats.sportbox.ru
 
 

1987 births
Footballers from Saint Petersburg
Living people
Russian footballers
Association football forwards
FC Petrotrest players
FC Zenit Saint Petersburg players
FC BATE Borisov players
Belarusian Premier League players
Russian expatriate footballers
Expatriate footballers in Belarus